Croatian–Bulgarian battle of 854 was the first known military conflict between the armies of Bulgaria (from 913 Bulgarian Empire), under the rule of Boris I, and the Duchy of Littoral Croatia, ruled by Duke Trpimir I, during the First Croatian-Bulgarian War. It was fought on the Croatian territory in the vicinity of the Croatian–Bulgarian border in present-day northeastern Bosnia and Herzegovina. None of warring sides emerged victorious, Bulgarian forces retreated and finally both parties subsequently concluded a peace treaty.

Background 

In the middle of the 9th century Bulgaria was a powerful country in the central and eastern Balkans. The Bulgarian ruler Boris I from Krum's dynasty made an alliance with the Moravian Prince Rastislav to strengthen his position against King Louis II of Germany, the ruler of East Francia. On the other side, Duke Trpimir I of Croatia was a faithful Frankish vassal. Between 846 and 848, he occasionally but effectively fought against the Byzantine Empire and the Republic of Venice both on land and sea.

After the successful war against Rascia, a medieval Serbian state, Bulgaria's ongoing expansion to the west reached Croatian borders. Bulgarian forces invaded Croatia approximately in 853 or 854 in northeastern Bosnia, where Croatia and Bulgaria bordered at the time.

Battle and aftermath

According to available sources, there was only one major battle between the Bulgarian army and the Croatian forces. Sources say that the invading army led by the powerful Bulgarian Khan Boris I fought Duke Trpimir's forces on the mountainous territory of present-day northeastern Bosnia and Herzegovina in 854. The exact place and time of the battle is not known due to the lack of contemporary accounts of the battle. Neither Bulgarian nor Croatian side emerged victorious. Very soon afterward, both Boris of Bulgaria and Trpimir of Croatia turned to diplomacy and reached a peace treaty. Negotiations resulted in a long term establishment of peace with the border between the Duchy of Croatia and the Bulgarian Khanate stabilized at the Drina River (between modern-day Bosnia and Herzegovina and the Republic of Serbia).

The situation changed only when Simeon I, Bulgarian Tsar, started a new war against the Byzantine Empire and Croatia as well, by the end of the 9th century and in the first quarter of the 10th century, which ended with Simeon's death in 927.

See also 

 Croatian–Bulgarian wars
 Old Great Bulgaria
 Timeline of Croatian history
 List of rulers of Croatia
 List of Bulgarian monarchs
 Medieval Bulgarian army
 History of Croatia
 History of Bulgaria
 Transdanubian Bulgaria
 Byzantine–Bulgarian wars

References 

9th-century military history of Croatia
9th century in Bulgaria
850s conflicts
854
Battles involving medieval Croatia
Military history of Bosnia and Herzegovina
Battles of the Middle Ages